Kortrijk/AZ Groeninge Heliport  is a heliport serving AZ Groeninge located in Kortrijk, West Flanders, Belgium.

See also
List of airports in Belgium
List of airports by ICAO code: E

References

External links 

Airports in West Flanders